Xavier College is a Roman Catholic, day and boarding school predominantly for boys, founded in 1872 by the Society of Jesus, with its main campus located in Kew, an eastern suburb of Melbourne, Victoria, Australia. Classes started in 1878.

The college is part of the international network of Jesuit schools begun in Messina, Sicily in 1548. Originally an all-boys school, the College now offers co-education until Year 4, and an all-boys environment from then on. In 2011, the school had 2,085 students on roll, including 76 boarders.

The school is in the Archdiocese of Melbourne, and is affiliated with the Independent Primary School Heads of Australia (IPSHA) formerly the Junior School Heads Association of Australia (JSHAA), the Association of Heads of Independent Schools of Australia (AHISA), the Australian Boarding Schools' Association (ABSA), and the Associated Public Schools of Victoria (APS).

In December 2010, The Age reported that, on the number of alumni who had received a top Order of Australia honour, Xavier College ranked equal tenth among Australian schools.

Grant Thomas described the school as "the best-connected school in Melbourne". Its notable alumni include one archbishop, two state governors, one deputy prime minister, one state premier, three deputy premiers, one High Court justice and numerous Supreme Court justices.

History

What is now called "The Senior Campus" is located in Barkers Road, Kew, 8 kilometres (5 miles) from the centre of Melbourne. The foundation stone of the campus was laid in 1872 and the school began formally in 1878 on land known originally as Mornane's Paddock. Founded as a Jesuit school, it was originally named St Francis Xavier's College. Construction continued during the school's early years, with the main oval added in 1883, and the West Wing and Great Hall in 1890. In 1900, Xavier replaced St Patrick's College in East Melbourne as the only Catholic institution among the six Associated Public Schools at that time. A Memorial Chapel on the Senior Campus was constructed in memory of Old Xaverians killed in the First World War, opening in 1934.

In 1993, a multi-purpose sports centre, the Stephenson Centre (since renamed), was opened. A science facility and the Eldon Hogan Performing Arts Centre opened on the campus in 2008, with eleven science laboratories, a music rehearsal room, and a 500-seat auditorium.

At his appointment as principal in October 1997, Chris McCabe was the first lay head of a Jesuit school in Australia. On his retirement at the end of 2008, the post was filled by Chris Hayes, the former principal at St Edmund's, Canberra.

Some buildings on the Senior Campus, and Studley House at the Burke Hall Campus, are listed on the Victorian Heritage Register.

Xavier has a long-standing rivalry with St Kevin's College, in legal circles, an Old Xaverian Supreme Court judge quipping that 'You boys who were taught by the Brothers can never aspire to the Supreme Court. Positions on that Bench are reserved for those of us who were taught by the Jesuits'.

Memorial Chapel
An Italian Renaissance style chapel was built in 1927 to celebrate the golden jubilee of Xavier College. From conception to completion, construction took around sixteen years and was led by Rectors Edmund Frost and Frank O’Keefe.

The foundation stone reads:

Burke Hall

In 1920, Studley Hall, a gift from T.M. Burke, a Catholic businessman, was opened in 1921 as Xavier's first preparatory school. James O'Dwyer SJ, Rector of Xavier between 1908 and 1917, became Burke Hall's first headmaster, before the campus was renamed Burke Hall several years later in honour of its benefactor. Burke donated a classroom block in 1923 and, in 1926, Burke's wife provided funding for a construction of a chapel in memory of her deceased brother. The campus was extended in 1966 with the donation of an adjacent mansion from the estate of John Wren following his death. After renovations to the original ballroom, which in 1975 became the library, and the original hall had been converted to classrooms, a new classroom block was built in 1987. A multi-purpose hall was constructed in 1997 overlooking the main oval that was re-graded in 1998. In 2002, a co-educational Early Years Centre was opened on the Burke Hall campus for students up to grade 4. In 2011, a new classroom block, the St Mary MacKillop Building, was added and named after the first Australian-born saint, the St Mary MacKillop is a space for classes year 5 & 6.

Kostka Hall
Following the request by Daniel Mannix, Archbishop of Melbourne, that the school should have a campus in the southern suburbs of the city, William Hackett SJ, Rector of Xavier opened the Kostka Hall Junior campus in 1937, with the addition of a second building, Marchwood (also known as St Johns). This was demolished in 1959 to make way for a major building project, including classrooms, tuckshop, and administrative buildings, and a chapel was built in 1967. Science rooms were added in 1969, and in the 1970s the Jesuits bought various adjoining properties to expand the campus. In 1996 a multi-purpose hall was completed with a new arts centre opened in 1998. In 2005 an Early Years Centre based on the one at Burke Hall was opened. This campus is scheduled to be shut down in 2021.

Buxton Campus
In addition to the three main campuses, the school has an outdoor education facility in Buxton, near Marysville, and a rowing shed on the banks of the Yarra River. It previously leased the historical mansion Billilla in Halifax Street, Brighton, from the Bayside City Council. In 2009, the Buxton outdoor education centre was temporarily closed due to extensive damage from the Black Saturday bushfires in Victoria, and was later sold in 2015.

Houses

Senior Campus
After existing in some form for several decades, in 1977 the system of inter-house sport and activities was restructured. Each house was assigned a housemaster and seven tutors. Boys are split up into these seven tutor groups within each house and the tutor group meets each day with the tutor acting as mentor during their four-year attendance. House meetings take place around once a week, lockers are organised according to house and several inter-house sporting events are held each year. In 1991, the houses, previously known by their colour, were given names. and in 2010, the new houses of MacKillop and Regis were added.

† Unawarded 2001–2002.

‡ Gonzaga and Claver shared the 2010 Old Xaverians Trophy for the Champion House, having accumulated the same number of points throughout the year.

Burke Hall
The six houses of Burke Hall had existed for many years as Hodgson, Ignatius, Studley, Surbiton, Trawalla, and Waverley. In 1987, two new houses were added and with the exception of Ignatius, the houses were renamed.

‡ Tied premierships: 1987, 2006.

Early Years Centre
Upon its foundation in 2002, separate houses were created for the Early Years Centre students at Burke Hall.

Kostka Hall
Awards commenced in 1971.

Curriculum
Xavier offers its senior students the Victorian Certificate of Education (VCE). Thirty-three VCE subjects and five external VET studies are offered. Xavier is one of only fifteen schools in Victoria to offer Latin and one of only two schools which offer Ancient Greek, which it has done continuously since 1878. Xavier and sister school Genazzano FCJ College have collaborated to develop a cross curriculum appreciation of the Classics as seen in both school's Latin as a LOTE option. Xavier does not offer the International Baccalaureate.

Xavier has a strong academic history. For each of the past sixteen years (excluding 2009 and 2015) the Dux of the school received an ATAR score of 99.95, the highest possible. In 2008, 2010, 2011 and 2016, three students achieved this mark at Xavier out of 32 in the state. In 2012, five students achieved the maximum ATAR of 99.95.

Co-curriculum
The main activities include Sport, Music, Drama, Debating, and Community Service. Students may also join specific interest groups such as the Chess Club. Outdoor Education is compulsory in Years 5 to 10, and students spend up to one week at a range of venues, where they are given instruction in a variety of activities.

Community service
Students are encouraged to participate in community service, and a minimum amount of completed service hours is mandated. Each Friday evening Xavier students volunteer their time at a tutoring school in housing commission apartments in Richmond, where many residents are recent migrants or refugees. This activity is completed with students from the sister school Genazzano FCJ College. Year 11 students are required to participate in an additional 35 hours while on a week-long community service placement.

In collaboration with Genazzano FCJ College, Xavier College participates in a community outreach program in conjunction with the combined parishes of Our Lady of Good Counsel, Deepdene, Sacred Heart, Kew and Immaculate Conception, Hawthorn. For the duration of one week, 12 students from the partnered schools participate in a community building program in Bourke, an Outback town of New South Wales.

Debating
From Year 8 and above, students have the opportunity to participate in the Toorak division of the Debaters Association of Victoria competition. The college also takes part in the annual Jesuit Schools' Debating Carnival competing with Aloysius, Ignatius Riverview, Ignatius Adelaide and Loyola Mt Druitt.

Sport

Sport is compulsory for all students at Xavier, and in addition to cricket and Australian rules football, a range of sporting activities are offered including
athletics,
badminton,
basketball,
cross country,
hockey,
lawn bowls,
martial arts,
rowing,
rugby union,
sailing
soccer,
swimming,
table tennis,
tennis,
triathlon,
water polo, and volleyball.

Cricket is the main summer sport and the school has won premierships in 2009/10 and 2010/11. Two alumni who pursued careers in the sport were Percy McDonnell (1860-1896) who captained the Australian Test team in six matches, including the tour of England in 1888, and Karl Schneider (1905-1928), who is described in Cricinfo as one of "the most naturally gifted batsmen to have graced the game". While at the school, he played in the 1st XI for four years, three of which as captain. He broke the APS runs (1642) and wickets (139) records which remain unbroken, and captained Xavier to back-to-back premierships in 1923–24. Due to the performances of David Seal in 1974 the school won the premiership once again after fifty years. Cricket alongside rowing (colloquially known as XCBC) are the two biggest summer sports at the college.

The school's Australian rules football team has produced numerous VFL/AFL players, and has won thirty football premierships, third of the APS schools behind Scotch (36) and Melbourne Grammar (35). The Old Xaverians Football Club has also been successful in the Victorian Amateur Football Association (VAFA), winning eight premierships in the last decade.

Along with football, the school's Old Xaverian community also links with the Old Xaverians Soccer Club and Old Xaverians Athletics Club.

APS Premierships 
Xavier has won the following APS premierships:

 Athletics (16) - 1957, 1961, 1963, 1964, 1965, 1967, 1968, 1969, 1970, 1975, 1976, 1977, 1979, 1980, 1991, 2009
 Basketball (3) - 2000, 2014, 2019
 Cricket (11) - 1910, 1923, 1924, 1974, 1986, 1998, 2002, 2004, 2009, 2010, 2020
 Cross Country (3) - 2004, 2008, 2014
 Football (30) - 1910, 1917, 1924, 1932, 1933, 1955, 1964, 1965, 1973, 1976, 1977, 1978, 1980, 1981, 1984, 1985, 1986, 1987, 1988, 1989, 1990, 1991, 1993, 1994, 1998, 2000, 2001, 2002, 2003, 2021
 Futsal (3) - 2015, 2020, 2021
 Hockey (4) - 1999, 2004, 2005, 2007
 Rowing (5) - 1928, 1929, 1937, 1948, 1999
 Soccer (10) - 1997, 1998, 2002, 2007, 2008, 2011, 2015, 2017, 2018, 2022
 Tennis (4) - 1995, 2007, 2008, 2009
 Volleyball (2) - 2014, 2018
 Water Polo (8) - 2006, 2007, 2013, 2014, 2015, 2016, 2017, 2019

Performing Arts
Performing Arts have been part of the school's activities since 1929, with Musical Theatre/Operetta and Dramatic Plays having a shared focus in the college's co-curricular program. The school conducts an annual Senior Musical Production with Genazzano FCJ College as well as the annual Winter Play and Spring Play, which has been performed in collaboration with Loreto Mandeville Hall since 2000. The two Junior Campuses also have Performing Arts and Dramatic programs, each staging a major production every year. With the development of both the Crypt Drama Studio, below the Memorial Chapel, in 1999 and the Eldon Hogan Performing Arts Centre, performing arts at the college has become an integral part in the school's co-curricular program.

The Yearly Senior Calendar includes:
Annual Musical Production in late February/early March, produced in association with Genazzano FCJ College. (Year 10,11,12)
The Comedy Revue, run entirely by and for students in late March. (Year 9,10,11,12)
VCE Theatre Studies Play, produced by the VCE Theatre Studies Class in May. (Year 11,12)
Annual Winter Play, produced in late July in association with Loreto Mandevalle Hall Toorak. (Year 9,10,11,12)
VCE Theatre Studies and Drama Solo and Monologue Performance Night in late September (Year 11,12)
Spring Play, coordinated and held at Loreto Mandevalle Hall, Toorak, in association with Xavier College Drama. (Year 9,10,11)

Maytime Fair
The Maytime Fair has been held annually in May since 1952 and is hosted by Xavier College. It raises funds for the work of the Jesuit Mission, with support from friends and benefactors connected with schools, parishes, and other communities in Victoria and beyond. The annual fairs have been assisted by traditional sister school Genazzano FCJ College, and together, the two schools have provided a number of student-run stalls such as "Go Nuts for Donuts", a Fairy Tent and face-painting, amongst others.

Each stall and attraction at the Maytime Fair donates its profit to the work of Jesuit Mission. The Maytime Fair consistently contributes over $100,000 each year for work in the developing world, including India, Cambodia, East Timor and Myanmar. In 2008 over $130,000 was raised, which was given to assist in the relief effort by Jesuit Missionaries in response to the 2008 Sichuan earthquake. In 2010, over $150,000 was raised, and in 2016 $260,000 was raised

Notable alumni

Alumni of Xavier College are known as Old Xaverians, and all former students become members the Old Xaverians' Association (OXA).

In politics, academia and the law, Xavier's alumni include:

 Richard Alston, a former Federal minister and diplomat
 William Cox, a former Governor of Tasmania 
 Tim Fischer, a former Deputy Prime Minister
 Sir James Gobbo, a former Governor of Victoria
 Rob Hulls, a former Deputy Premier of Victoria
 Phillip Lynch, a former federal Treasurer and Deputy Leader of federal Opposition
 Julian McGauran, a former Senator for Victoria
 Peter McGauran, a former Federal minister
 Pat McNamara, a former Deputy Premier of Victoria
 T. J. Ryan, a former Premier of Queensland
 Bill Shorten, a former Leader of the Opposition
 Simon Steward Judge of the High Court of Australia
 Dan Tehan, a current Federal minister
 Brian O'Shaughnessy (philosopher), philosopher of mind and action

In other areas, notable Old Xaverians include:

 Timothy Conigrave, actor, writer, and activist 
 Robert De Castella, world champion marathon runner
 Peter Dahlsen, actor and barrister
 Will Davison, professional sports racing driver
 Alan Jones, Formula One world championship-winning driver
 Paul Fitzgerald, noted Australian portrait artist
 James P. Gorman, CEO of Morgan Stanley
 Denis Hart, the 8th Catholic Archbishop of Melbourne
 Lloyd J. Williams, property developer and businessman
 Jobe Watson, former Essendon AFL captain
 Bailey Smith, current Western Bulldogs AFL player
 Josh P. Kennedy, current Sydney Swans AFL co-captain
 Dan Hannebery, current St Kilda AFL player
 Ted Richards, former Sydney Swans AFL player
 Luke Ball, former Collingwood AFL player
 Sean Darcy, current Fremantle Dockers AFL player

 Laitham Vandermeer- Western Bulldogs player
 Changkuoth Jiath- Hawthorn AFL player
 Daniel Robinson-former Sydney Swans player

In popular culture
 Holding the Man, a memoir, a play, and a feature film, begins at Kostka Hall and then the Senior Campus.
 Remembering the Man, a feature-length documentary about the memoir Holding the Man, includes footage and photos of the Xavier College Senior Campus in the late 1970s and interviews with former students.
 Sir Les Patterson, a fictional character portrayed by Barry Humphries, "attended" Xavier College.

Historical sexual abuse allegations
In March 2013, a submission was made to Victoria's parliamentary inquiry into child sexual abuse about the alleged abuse of children in its care in the 1960s and 1970s.

See also

 Catholic education in Australia
 List of schools in Victoria
 List of high schools in Victoria
 Victorian Certificate of Education
 List of Jesuit schools

References

Further reading

External links

Associated Public Schools of Victoria
Educational institutions established in 1878
Catholic primary schools in Melbourne
Jesuit secondary schools in Australia
Boarding schools in Victoria (Australia)
Catholic secondary schools in Melbourne
Boys' schools in Victoria (Australia)
Catholic boarding schools in Australia
Junior School Heads Association of Australia Member Schools
1878 establishments in Australia
Private primary schools in Melbourne
Jesuit primary schools in Australia
Buildings and structures in the City of Boroondara
 Xavier College